Michael Berrer and Rainer Schüttler were the defending champions, but chose not to participate this year.

Seeds

Draw

Draw

External links
Doubles Draw

Doubles